A derecho (from  , 'straight') is a widespread, long-lived, straight-line wind storm that is associated with a fast-moving group of severe thunderstorms known as a mesoscale convective system.

Derechos can cause hurricane and tornado-force winds, heavy rains, and flash floods. In many cases, convection-induced winds take on a bow echo (backward "C") form of squall line, often forming beneath an area of diverging upper tropospheric winds, and in a region of both rich low-level moisture and warm-air advection. Derechos move rapidly in the direction of movement of their associated storms, similar to an outflow boundary (gust front), except that the wind remains sustained for a greater period of time (often increasing in strength after onset), and may exceed hurricane-force. A derecho-producing convective system may remain active for many hours and, occasionally, over multiple days.

A warm-weather phenomenon, derechos occur mostly in summer, especially during June, July, and August in the Northern Hemisphere (or March, April, and May in the Southern Hemisphere), within areas of moderately strong instability and moderately strong vertical wind shear. However, derechos may occur at any time of the year, and can occur as frequently at night as during the day.

Various studies since the 1980s have shed light on the physical processes responsible for the production of widespread damaging winds by thunderstorms.  In addition, it has become apparent that the most damaging derechos are associated with particular types of mesoscale convective systems that are self-perpetuating (meaning that the convective systems are not strongly dependent on the larger-scale meteorological processes such as those associated with blizzard-producing winter storms and strong cold fronts).  In addition, the term "derecho" sometimes is misapplied to convectively generated wind events that are not particularly well-organized or long-lasting.  For these reasons, a more precise, physically based definition of "derecho" has been introduced within the meteorological community.

Etymology

Derecho comes from the Spanish adjective for "straight" (or "direct"), in contrast with a tornado which is a "twisted" wind. The word was first used in the American Meteorological Journal in 1888 by Gustavus Detlef Hinrichs in a paper describing the phenomenon and based on a significant derecho event that crossed Iowa on 31 July 1877.

Development
Organized areas of thunderstorm activity reinforce pre-existing frontal zones, and can outrun cold fronts. The resultant mesoscale convective system (MCS) often forms at the point of the strongest divergence of the upper-level flow, and new storm cells are developed in the area with the greatest low-level inflow. The convection tends to move east or toward the equator, roughly parallel to low-level thickness lines and usually somewhat to the right of the mean tropospheric flow. When the convection is strongly linear or slightly curved, the MCS is called a squall line, with the strongest winds typically occurring just behind the leading edge of the significant wind shift and pressure rise.

Classic derechos occur with squall lines that contain bow- or spearhead-shaped features as seen by weather radar that are known as bow echoes or spearhead echoes. Squall lines typically "bow out" due to the formation of a mesoscale high-pressure system which forms within the stratiform rain area behind the initial convective line. This high-pressure area is formed due to strong descending air currents behind the squall line, and could come in the form of a downburst.  The size of the bow may vary, and the storms associated with the bow may die and redevelop.

During the cool season within the Northern Hemisphere, derechos generally develop within a pattern of mid-tropospheric southwesterly winds, in an environment of low to moderate atmospheric instability (caused by relative warmth and moisture near ground level, with cooler air aloft, as measured by convective available potential energy), and high values of vertical wind shear ( within the lowest  of the atmosphere).

Warm season derechos in the Northern Hemisphere most often form in west to northwesterly flow at mid-levels of the troposphere, with moderate to high levels of thermodynamic instability. As previously mentioned, derechos favor environments of low-level warm advection and significant low-level moisture.

Classification and criteria
A common definition is a thunderstorm complex that produces a damaging wind swath of at least , featuring a concentrated area of convectively-induced wind gusts exceeding . According to the National Weather Service (NWS) criterion, a derecho is classified as a band of storms that have winds of at least  along the entire span of the storm front, maintained over a time span of at least six hours. Some studies add a requirement that no more than two or three hours separate any two successive wind reports. A more recent, more physically based definition of "derecho" proposes that the term be reserved for use with convective systems that not only contain unique radar-observed features such as bow echoes and mesovortices, but also for events that produce damage swaths at least 100 km (60 miles) wide and 650 km (400 miles) long. A great visual example of a derecho was made available by time-lapse imagery from satellites operated by the National Oceanic and Atmospheric Association, which clearly recorded the outer boundary layer of a derecho and the intensity of associated lightning strikes quickly moving eastward in Midwestern states on 10 August 2020.

In order to be classified as a derecho, a wind storm must meet the following criteria 
 Wind damage swath extending for more than 
 Wind gusts of at least  along most of its length
 Several, well-separated  or greater gusts

Four types of derechos are generally recognized:

 Serial derecho – This type of derecho is usually associated with a very deep low.
This type of serial derecho is less common than the multi-bow kind. An example of a single-bow serial derecho is the derecho that occurred in association with the October 2010 North American storm complex.
One example of a multi-bow serial derecho is a derecho that occurred during the 1993 Storm of the Century in Florida. Because of embedded supercells, tornadoes can spin out of these types of derechos. This is a much more common type of serial derecho than the single-bow kind. Multi-bow serial derechos can be associated with line echo wave patterns (LEWPs) on weather radar.
 Progressive derecho – A line of thunderstorms take the bow-shape and may travel for hundreds of miles along stationary fronts. Examples of this include "Hurricane Elvis" in 2003 and the Boundary Waters-Canadian Derecho of 4–5 July 1999. Tornado formation is less common in a progressive than serial type.
 Hybrid derecho – A derecho with characteristics of both a serial and progressive derecho. Similar to serial derechos and progressive derechos, these types of derechos are associated with a deep low, but are relatively small in size. An example is the Late-May 1998 tornado outbreak and derecho that moved through the central Northern Plains and the Southern Great Lakes on 30–31 May 1998.
 Low dewpoint derecho – A derecho that occurs in an environment of comparatively limited low-level moisture, with appreciable moisture confined to the mid-levels of the atmosphere. Such derechos most often occur between late fall and early spring in association with strong low-pressure systems. Low dew point derechos are essentially organized bands of successive, dry downbursts. The Utah-Wyoming derecho of 31 May 1994 was an event of this type. It produced a  wind gust at Provo, Utah, where sixteen people were injured, and removed part of the roof of the Saltair Pavilion on the Great Salt Lake.

Characteristics
Winds in a derecho can be enhanced by downburst clusters embedded inside the storm. These straight-line winds may exceed , reaching  in past events. Tornadoes sometimes form within derecho events, although such events are often difficult to confirm due to the additional damage caused by straight-line winds in the immediate area.

With the average tornado in the United States and Canada rating in the low end of the F/EF1 classification at  peak winds and most or all of the rest of the world even lower, derechos tend to deliver the vast majority of extreme wind conditions over much of the territory in which they occur. Only in 40 to 65 percent or so of the United States resting on the coast of the Atlantic basin, and a fraction of the Everglades, are derechos surpassed in this respect — by landfalling hurricanes, which at their worst may have winds as severe as EF3 tornadoes.

Certain derecho situations are the most common instances of severe weather outbreaks which may become less favorable to tornado production as they become more violent; the height of 30–31 May 1998 upper Middle West-Canada-New York State derecho and the latter stages of significant tornado and severe weather outbreaks in 2003 and 2004 are only three examples of this. Some upper-air measurements used for severe-weather forecasting may reflect this point of diminishing return for tornado formation, and the mentioned three situations were instances during which the rare Particularly Dangerous Situation severe thunderstorm variety of severe weather watches were issued from the Storm Prediction Center of the U.S. National Oceanic & Atmospheric Administration.

Some derechos develop a radar signature resembling that of a hurricane in the low levels. They may have a central eye free of precipitation, with a minimum central pressure and surrounding bands of strong convection, but are really associated with an MCS developing multiple squall lines, and are not tropical in nature. These storms have a warm core, like other mesoscale convective systems. One such derecho occurred across the Midwestern U.S. on 21 July 2003. An area of convection developed across eastern Iowa near a weak stationary/warm front and ultimately matured, taking on the shape of a wavy squall line across western Ohio and southern Indiana. The system re-intensified after leaving the Ohio Valley, starting to form a large hook, with occasional hook echoes appearing along its eastern side. A surface low pressure center formed and became more impressive later in the day. Another example is the May 2009 Southern Midwest derecho.

Location

Derechos in North America form predominantly from April to August, peaking in frequency from May into July. During this time of year, derechos are mostly found in the Midwestern United States and the U.S. Interior Highlands most commonly from Oklahoma and across the Ohio Valley. During mid-summer when a hot and muggy air mass covers the north-central U.S., they will often develop farther north into Manitoba or Northwestern Ontario, sometimes well north of the Canada–US border.

North Dakota, Minnesota, and upper Michigan are also vulnerable to derecho storms when such conditions are in place. They often occur along stationary fronts on the northern periphery of where the most intense heat and humidity bubble exists. Late-year derechos are normally confined to Texas and the Deep South, although a late-summer derecho struck upper parts of the New York State area after midnight on 7 September 1998. Warm season derechos have greater instability than their cold season counterpart, while cool season derechos have greater shear than their warm season counterpart.

Although these storms most commonly occur in North America, derechos can occur elsewhere in the world, with a few areas relatively frequently. Outside North America, they sometimes are called by different names. For example, in Bangladesh and parts of Eastern India, a type of storm known as "Kalbaisakhi" or "Nor'westers" may be a progressive derecho. One such event occurred on 10 July 2002 in Germany: a serial derecho killed eight people and injured 39 near Berlin. Derechos occur in southeastern South America (particularly Argentina and southern Brazil) and South Africa as well, and on rarer occasions, close to or north of the 60th parallel in northern Canada. Primarily a mid-latitudes phenomenon, derechos do occur in the Amazon Basin of Brazil. On 8 August 2010, a derecho struck Estonia and tore off the tower of Väike-Maarja Church. Derechos are occasionally observed in China.

Damage risk
Since derechos occur during warm months and often in places with cold winter climates, people who are most at risk are those involved in outdoor activities. Campers, hikers, and motorists are most at risk because of falling trees toppled over by straight-line winds. Wide swaths of forest have been felled by such storms. People who live in mobile homes are also at risk; mobile homes that are not anchored to the ground may be overturned from the high winds. Across the United States, Michigan and New York have incurred many of the fatalities from derechos. Prior to Hurricane Katrina, the death tolls from derechos and hurricanes were comparable for the United States.

Derechos may also severely damage an urban area's electrical distribution system, especially if these services are routed above ground. The derecho that struck Chicago, Illinois on 11 July 2011 left more than 860,000 people without electricity. The June 2012 North American derecho took out electrical power to more than 3.7 million customers starting in the Midwestern United States, across the central Appalachians, into the Mid-Atlantic States during a heat wave.

The storm was referred to as one of the largest "land-based hurricanes" in recorded history spawning 17 confirmed tornadoes across Wisconsin, Illinois, and Indiana. Ten million acres of crops were damaged or destroyed, accounting for roughly a third of the state of Iowa's agricultural area. Over a million homes across the Midwest were without basic services such as water and electricity. Iowa Governor Reynolds requested $4 billion in federal aid to assist in the recovery efforts. Winds were confirmed as having stirred up in Colorado and Nebraska, and then proceeded in force crossing 5 states including Iowa, Minnesota, Illinois, Indiana, and Ohio leaving destruction in excess of $7.5 billion in estimated damages.

A derecho in southern Ontario and western Quebec travelled lengthwise along the most heavily populated region in Canada, reaching peak wind speeds of 190 km/h. The derecho killed 10 people and caused $875 million property damage 21 May 2022, the sixth largest "insured loss event" in Canadian history. Destruction of utility poles deprived some rural communities of telephone and electricity services for several weeks.

Aviation
Derechos can be hazardous to aviation due to embedded microbursts, downbursts, and downburst clusters. In addition, the powerful updrafts and high cloud tops can cause for dangerous conditions. Their sheer size also makes them very difficult to navigate around.

See also

 Convective storm detection
 Extreme weather
 Mesocyclone
 Mesoscale convective vortex (MCV)
 Mesovortex
 Microburst
 List of derecho events

References

Further reading 
 Ashley, Walker S., et al. (2004). "Derecho Families". Proceedings of the 22nd Conference on Severe Local Storms, American Meteorological Society, Hyannis, Massachusetts.

External links

 Facts about derechos (Storm Prediction Center's "About Derechos" web page; Stephen Corfidi with Robert Johns and Jeffry Evans)
 What is a derecho? (University of Nebraska at Lincoln)
 What is a derecho? (Meteorologist Jeff Haby's education page)
 Derecho Hazards in the United States (Walker Ashley)
 Origin of the term "Derecho" as a Severe Weather Event (Meteorologist Robert Johns)
 A Mediterranean derecho: Catalonia(Spain), 17 August 2003 (ECSS 2003, León, Spain, 9–12 November 2004)
 American Museum of Natural History Science Bulletins: Derecho December 2003

 
Storm
Severe weather and convection
Weather hazards
Wind

Spanish words and phrases